In algebra, the local criterion for flatness gives conditions one can check to show flatness of a module.

Statement
Given a commutative ring A, an ideal I and an A-module M, suppose either
A is a Noetherian ring and M is idealwise separated for I: for every ideal ,  (for example, this is the case when A is a Noetherian local ring, I its maximal ideal and M finitely generated),
or
I is nilpotent.
Then the following are equivalent:

The assumption that “A is a Noetherian ring” is used to invoke the Artin–Rees lemma and can be weakened; see

Proof 
Following SGA 1, Exposé IV, we first prove a few lemmas, which are interesting themselves. (See also this blog post by Akhil Mathew for a proof of a special case.)

Proof: The equivalence of the first two can be seen by studying the Tor spectral sequence.
.
Conversely, considering  where F is B-free, we get:
.
Here, the last map is injective by flatness and that gives us 1. To see the "Moreover" part, if 1. is valid, then  and so

By descending induction, this implies 3. The converse is trivial. 

Proof: The assumption implies that  and so, since tensor product commutes with base extension,
. 

Consider the exact sequence of complexes:

Then  (it is so for large  and then use descending induction). 3. of Lemma 1 then implies that  is flat. 

Proof of the main statement.

Thus, assume that the first assumption is valid. Let  be an ideal and we shall show  is injective. For an integer , consider the exact sequence

.

We combine the two to get the exact sequence:

By the Artin–Rees lemma, given , we can find  such that . Since , we conclude .

 follows from Lemma 2.

Thus, the implication is established by an argument similar to that of

Application: characterization of an étale morphism 
The local criterion can be used to prove the following:

Proof: Assume that  is an isomorphism and we show f is étale. First, since  is faithfully flat (in particular is a pure subring), we have:
.
Hence,  is unramified (separability is trivial). Now, that  is flat follows from (1) the assumption that the induced map on completion is flat and (2) the fact that flatness descends under faithfully flat base change (it shouldn’t be hard to make sense of (2)).

Next, we show the converse: by the local criterion, for each n, the natural map 
is an isomorphism. By induction and the five lemma, this implies  is an isomorphism for each n. Passing to limit, we get the asserted isomorphism. 

Mumford’s Red Book gives an extrinsic proof of the above fact (Ch. III, § 5, Theorem 3).

Miracle flatness theorem 
B. Conrad calls the next theorem the miracle flatness theorem.

Notes

References 

Exposé IV of

External links 
blog post by Akhil Mathew

Commutative algebra